Balaclava railway station opened in 1892 and closed in 1992.

It was built of timber in the Jamaican Georgian architectural style. The upper of the two stories has a gable end roof; an adjoining hip roof has a downward fishtail fretwork on its eaves. The building has sash windows and recessed panel timber doors.

In 2003 it was reported as being in "deplorable condition" and "in need of major repairs".

It is on the list of designated National Heritage Sites in Jamaica.

Opening
From the Daily Gleaner of March 24, 1892:

Fares
In 1910 the third class fare from Balaclava to Kingston was 5/6 (five shillings and sixpence); first class was about double.

Accident
A serious derailment occurred at this station on July 30, 1938 killing 32 and injuring 70.

Current use
Since 1992 the station buildings have been leased to a small, local woodwork shop.

See also
Railway stations in Jamaica
Balaclava, Jamaica

External links
Aerial view.
Photos: Balaclava station (excellent), Balaclava station (small), Accident memorial, Inscription on accident memorial.
Examples of the station's postmark.

References

Railway stations in Jamaica
Buildings and structures in Saint Elizabeth Parish
Railway stations opened in 1892
Railway stations closed in 1992